And Furthurmore... is a live album by the American rock band Hot Tuna.  It was recorded on the 1998 Furthur Festival tour.  It was released on October 12, 1999.

And Furthurmore... was released in HDCD format.  This provides enhanced sound quality when played on CD players with HDCD capability, and is fully compatible with regular CD players.

Track listing 

 "I See the Light" (Jorma Kaukonen) / "Sunny Day Strut" (Kaukonen) – 6:50
 "Been So Long" (Kaukonen) – 3:52
 "True Religion" (Kaukonen) – 5:00
 "Third Week in Chelsea" (Kaukonen) – 4:47
 "Embryonic Journey" (Kaukonen) – 2:20
 "I Am the Light of This World" (Gary Davis) – 3:48
 "Watch the North Wind Rise" (Kaukonen) – 5:12
 "Water Song" (Kaukonen) – 6:02
 "Gypsy Fire" (Michael Falzarano) – 7:51
 "Just My Way" (Falzarano) – 7:07
 "Hypnotation Blues" (Kaukonen, Falzarano) – 8:33
 "Big Railroad Blues" (traditional) – 4:04
 "Funky #7" (Kaukonen, Jack Casady) – 11:37

Personnel

Hot Tuna 

 Jorma Kaukonen – guitar, vocals
 Jack Casady – bass
 Pete Sears – keyboards
 Michael Falzarano – guitar; vocals on "Gypsy Fire", "Just My Way", "Big Railroad Blues"
 Harvey Sorgen – drums

Production 
 Michael Falzarano – producer
 Tom Flye – engineer, mixing engineer
 Jeffrey Norman – mastering engineer
 Richard Leeds – design
 Timothy Truman – cover illustration
 Rob Cohn – photographs
 Jeff Tamarkin – liner notes

References

External links 
 

Hot Tuna live albums
1999 live albums
Grateful Dead Records live albums